Po strništi bos (English - Barefoot, or Barefoot on Stalks) is a 2017 Czech war comedy film directed by Jan Svěrák. It is a prequel to The Elementary School.

Plot
The film follows the young boy Eda Souček and his extended family during World War II. The family has to move to his family's home in the  countryside home because Eda's father refuses to Heil in his job. Eda makes new friends and gets used to life in village. He also meets his uncle who is known as Vlk. Vlk doesn't get along with rest of the family because he tried to strangle his mother. Eda eventually befriends Vlk. Life in the village is influenced by war.

Cast
 Alois Grec as Eda
 Tereza Voříšková as Mother
 Ondřej Vetchý as Father
 Oldřich Kaiser as Vlk
 Jan Tříska as Grandfather
 Viera Pavlíková as Grandmother
 Hynek Čermák as Uncle
 Petra Špalková as Aunt
 Zdeněk Svěrák as Headmaster
 Václav Hubka as Ota
 Niklas Klinecký as Satík
 Josef Bedlivý as Prcek
 Petr Uhlík as Vlastík
 Sebastian Pošmourný as Škaloud
 Zuzana Stivínová as Vlk's Wife
 Miroslav Hanuš as Bartoš
 Petr Brukner as Chrást
 Miroslav Táborský as Košťál

References

External links
 

2010s war comedy films
2017 films
2010s Czech-language films
Films directed by Jan Svěrák
Czech war comedy films
Czech resistance to Nazi occupation in film
Czech Lion Awards winners (films)
Slovak war comedy films
Danish war comedy films
2017 comedy films
Czech World War II films
Slovak World War II films
Czech prequel films
Danish prequel films
Slovak prequel films